The Best of King Diamond is a compilation album by the heavy metal band King Diamond.

Track listing
"The Candle" – 6:42
"Charon" – 4:17
"Halloween" – 4:15
"No Presents for Christmas" – 4:22
"Arrival" – 5:26
"A Mansion in Darkness" – 4:35
"The Family Ghost" – 4:08
"Abigail" – 4:52
"Welcome Home" – 4:37
"The Invisible Guests" – 5:04
"Tea" – 5:15
"At the Graves" – 8:57
"Sleepless Nights" – 5:05
"Eye of the Witch" – 3:48
"Burn" – 3:44

Credits
King Diamond - Vocals, keyboards
Andy LaRocque - Guitar
Michael Denner - Guitar
Pete Blakk - Guitar
Timi Hansen - Bass
Hal Patino - Bass
Mikkey Dee - Drums
Snowy Shaw - Drums

References

King Diamond compilation albums
2003 greatest hits albums
Roadrunner Records compilation albums